Only Yesterday is a 1933 American pre-Code drama film about a young woman who becomes pregnant by her boyfriend before he rushes off to fight in World War I. It stars Margaret Sullavan (in her film debut) and John Boles.

According to the on-screen credit, the film's story line was "suggested" by the 1931 nonfiction bestseller Only Yesterday by Frederick Lewis Allen, who had sold Universal the rights to his book. The film is set in a time frame close to that of Allen's book but otherwise bears no resemblance to it, and the film's title may simply have been an attempt to capitalize on the book's fame at the time of the film's release. The plot of the film appears to be based closely on Letter from an Unknown Woman (Briefe einer Unbekannten) by Stefan Zweig, published first in 1922 and in English translation a decade later.

According to the New York Times, some moviegoers contacted Zweig's publisher, Viking Press, noting similarities between the film and his book. The Times reported that "These similarities were bought and paid for by Universal Pictures", which moved the story to the United States, "altered the story greatly, and made no mention of Zweig's name in the film". The studio also paid "a large sum" for the right to use the title of Allen's book.

Cast
Margaret Sullavan as Mary Lane
John Boles as James Stanton Emerson
Edna May Oliver as Leona
Billie Burke as Julia Warren
Benita Hume as Phyllis Emerson
Reginald Denny as Bob
George Meeker as Dave Reynolds
Jimmy Butler as Jim Jr., Mary's son
Noel Francis as Letitia
Bramwell Fletcher as Scott Hughes
June Clyde as Deborah
Franklin Pangborn as Tom (uncredited)

Billie Dove and Gloria Stuart were considered for the lead before Margaret Sullavan was cast.

Plot

Unlike in the Zweig story, in the end Emerson acknowledges his son.

Reception
The film was Universal's only outstanding success released that year according to a poll of movie theater managers.

Preservation
The film and trailer are preserved in the Library of Congress collection.

See also
 Letter from an Unknown Woman, a 1948 film based on Zweig's novel

References

Richard Brody, "The Spirit of the Women’s-Rights Movement in a 1933 Film", The New Yorker, January 1, 2018
T.J. Ross, "A Romantic Feminist: Margaret Sullavan in Only Yesterday", in Pat Browne, editor, Heroines of Popular Culture (Bowling Green State University Popular Press, 1987), pp. 63ff.

External links
 

 

1933 films
1933 drama films
American black-and-white films
American drama films
Films based on American novels
Films based on Austrian novels
Films based on works by Stefan Zweig
Films directed by John M. Stahl
American pregnancy films
Universal Pictures films
1930s pregnancy films
1930s English-language films
1930s American films